Antheraea cihangiri is a moth of the family Saturniidae found in Pulau Peleng.

External links
Image

Antheraea
Moths of Indonesia
Moths described in 1998